Jhonny Raúl Quiñónez Ruiz (born 11 June 1998) is an Ecuadorian footballer who plays as a midfielder for Aucas.

Club career
On 30 August 2019, Quiñónez signed with Willem II from Ecuador. On 15 September 2019, Quiñónez made his professional debut with Willem II in a 4–1 Eredivisie loss to Heracles.

International career
He made his debut for the Ecuador national football team on 13 October 2019 in a friendly against Argentina.

References

External links

1998 births
Living people
Footballers from Quito
Ecuadorian footballers
Ecuador under-20 international footballers
Ecuador international footballers
Association football midfielders
Willem II (football club) players
S.D. Aucas footballers
Eredivisie players
Ecuadorian Serie A players
Ecuadorian Serie B players
Ecuadorian expatriate footballers
Expatriate footballers in the Netherlands